Nāṣīf ibn Ilyās Munʿim al-Maʿlūf (20 March 1823 – 14 May 1865), commonly known in the West as Nassif Mallouf, was a Lebanese lexicographer. He was a member of the Société Asiatique, a professor of Eastern literature at the Collège de la Propagande at Smyrna, and Secretary-Interpreter to the irregular Anglo-Ottoman cavalry. Besides Arabic, his mother tongue, he was learned in Persian, Turkish, English, French, Modern Greek and Italian.

Life
Mallouf was born in the village of Zabbougha, then in the Ottoman Empire.

As worded by Charles Malouf Samaha, after Lord Raglan's death in 1855, he was a dragoman under General Beatson.

Publications
 Liçani turkinin anakhtaridir ou Clef de la langue turque, 1848
 Dictionnaire de poche français-turc, ou, Trésor de la conversation, 1849
 "Fevaydi-charqiyè", ou Abrégé de grammaire orientale turque, arabe et persane, expliquée en langue turque, 1854
 Dictionnaire français-turc: avec la prononciation figurée, 1856
 Nouveau guide de la conversation en quatre langues: italien, grec-moderne, français et anglais, 1859
 Plaisanteries de Khodja Nasr-ed-din Efendi, 1859
 Guide en trois langues : française, anglaise et turque, 1860
 Grammaire élémentaire de la Langue Turque suivie de dialogues familiers avec la prononciation figurée et d'un petit secrétaire ou modèle de lettres avec la traduction française en regard, 1862
 Dictionnaire turc-français: Avec la prononciation figurée. II - Volume 2, 1867

References

Sources
 

1823 births
1865 deaths
Lebanese lexicographers
Members of the Société Asiatique
19th-century lexicographers